Seri is an indigenous language spoken by between 716 and 900 Seri people in Punta Chueca and El Desemboque, two villages on the coast of Sonora, Mexico. The language is generally considered an isolate, but attempts have been made to include it in the theoretical Hokan language family. No concrete evidence has been found for connections to other languages.

The earliest records of the Seri language are from 1692, but the population has remained fairly isolated. Extensive work on Seri began in 1951 by Edward and Mary Beck Moser with the Summer Institute of Linguistics.

The language is viable within its community and is used freely in daily life. Exceptions include primary and secondary school, some parts of local church services, and communications with Spanish speakers outside of the Seri community. Most members of the community, including youth, are fluent in their language, but the population of speakers is small and cultural knowledge has been dwindling since the traditional hunter-gatherer lifestyle was essentially replaced in the 1930s by fixed settlements. Furthermore, many children are no longer becoming fluent in the language, for a variety of reasons (schools, internet, or non-Seri friends); some children are completely monolingual in Spanish. For these reasons, Seri is listed as a vulnerable language by UNESCO.

Classification

The Serian family is a language family, with Seri as its only living member; related languages have disappeared in the last few centuries. Attempts have been made to link it to the Yuman family, to the now-extinct Salinan language of California, and to the much larger hypothetical Hokan family. These hypotheses came out of a period when attempts were being made to group all of the languages of the Americas into families. In the case of Seri, however, very little evidence has ever been produced. Until such evidence is  presented and evaluated, the language is most appropriately considered an isolate.

Name
The name "Seri" is an exonym for this people that has been used since the first contacts with the Spaniards (sometimes written differently, as "Ceres"). Gilg reported in 1692 that it was a Spanish name, but surely it was the name used by another group of the area to refer to the Seris. Nevertheless, modern claims that it is a Yaqui term that means something like "people of the sand" or an Opata term that means "people who run fast" are lacking in factual basis; no evidence has been presented for the former and no credible evidence has been presented for the latter.

The name used within the Seri community itself, for the language, is Cmiique iitom, which contrasts with Cocsar iitom ("Spanish language") and Maricaana iitom ("English language").  The expression is a noun phrase that is literally "(that) with which a Seri person speaks". The word Cmiique (phonetically ) is the singular noun for "Seri person". The word iitom is the oblique nominalization of the intransitive verb  ("talk"), with the prefix i- (third person possessor), and the null prefix for the nominalizer with this class of root. Another similar expression that one hears occasionally for the language is Cmiique iimx, which is a similar construction based on the transitive verb  ("tell") (root = amx).

It was appropriate for a project of that type, although it is not a commonly used term. Comcaac (phonetically ) is the plural form of Cmiique and yaza is the plural nominalized form corresponding to iitom. ( is the plural root, y- (with an accompanying vowel ablaut) is the nominalizer; the prefix for third person possessor elides before the y. The word  is a singular article (which combines with the plural noun to refer to the Seri community).

The language was erroneously referred to as Kunkaak as early as the beginning of the 20th century (as in Hernández 1904), and this mistake has been repeated up to now by people who confuse the name of an ethnic group with the name of its language (which are often the same in Spanish and English). The lexeme Comcaac is used in the Seri language only to refer to the people.

Phonology

Vowels

Vowel length is contrastive only in stressed syllables.

The nonrounded vowels  may be realized as diphthongs  when followed by the labialized consonants , but this small phonetic detail is not written in the community-based writing system.

Consonants

 occurs only in loanwords.  occurs in loanwords and in a few native words, where it may alternate with  depending on the word and the individual speaker.

The labial fricative  may be labiodental  for some speakers, and the postalveolar fricative  may be retroflex .

In unstressed syllables,  assimilates to the place of articulation of the following consonant. This assimilation may take place over word boundaries in connected speech. For some speakers, word-final  may become  at the end of a phrase or sentence, or when said in isolation. It can be documented, by careful examination of word lists collected in the nineteenth century, that some of these phonetic rules have arisen fairly recently.

Syllable structure
Syllable structure in Seri is fairly complex. Simple syllable onsets are most common, however, syllables without onsets can occur at the beginning of a word. The language generally allows up to three consonants to occur together at the beginning of a syllable, although consonants cannot be long word initially (i.e. /tːi/ or /pː/). Specific combinations that may occur are much less restricted than English, for instance. Seri three-consonant onsets such as /ptk/ do occur, as in ptcamn (Cortez spiny lobster, Panulirus inflatus). Simple codas occur, although complex ones are more common. Word-medial codas contain a single consonant, whereas word-final codas may include up to three. Clusters of four consonants also occur, but they are more rare in the lexicon:  in cösxtamt, ..., "there were many, ...";  in ipoomjc x, ... "if s/he brings it, ...", (with enclitic x).

The nuclei of Seri syllables can include one, two, or three vowels. Long vowels are indicated in writing by doubling (i.e. ⟨aa⟩ or ⟨ii⟩ for /aː/ or /iː/). Vowel clusters may include 3 separate elements, as in the one syllable word kaoi (NOM-D-delouse). Syllables with complex nuclei are stressed; otherwise, the stress generally occurs on the first syllable of a words root. Vowel clusters often occur in the initial syllable of a root.

Affixes, which may consist of one or more consonants with no vowels, can be added before or after existing consonant clusters, thereby complicating pronunciation and syllabification. When necessary, empty vowel positions are inserted and often filled with a syllabic nasal or an "i" to aid in pronunciation.

Stress
Stress is contrastive in Seri. Although it usually falls on the first syllable of a root, there are many words where it does not, mostly nouns, as well as a small class of common verbs whose stress may fall on a prefix rather than on the root. An alternative analysis, recently proposed and with fewer exceptions, assigns stress to the penultimate syllable of the root of a word (since suffixes are never stressed and prefixes receive stress only as a result of phonological fusion with the root). This rule is also sensitive to syllable weight. A heavy final syllable in the root attracts stress. A heavy syllable is one that has a long vowel or vowel cluster or a final consonant cluster. (A single consonant in the syllable coda is typically counted as extrametrical in Seri.)

Consonants following a stressed syllable are lengthened, and vowels separated from a preceding stressed vowel by a single consonant are also lengthened so that   ("ant") is pronounced . Such allophonically lengthened vowels may be longer than the phonemically long vowels found in stressed syllables. It also does not affect most loanwords.

Morphology
Verbs, nouns, and postpositions are inflected word categories in Seri.

Nouns
Nouns inflect for plurality through suffixation. Compare  'mourning dove' and  'mourning doves'. Pluralization is very complicated; for this reason, each noun is listed in the dictionary with its plural form. Some nouns ostensibly use an infix to indicate plural:  'grasshopper',  'grasshoppers'. A few nouns have completely suppletive plural forms:  'Seri person',  'Seri people',  'thing',  'things'.

Kinship terms and body part nouns inflect for possessors through prefixes (with slightly different prefix sets). Compare  'your son' (of man) and  'your head'. As they are obligatorily possessed nouns, a special prefix appears when no possessor is specified, and kinship terms sometimes have additional material at the end as well. Compare  'one's son', and  'one's head'. Some nouns have an additional plural form to distinguish between singular and plural possessors:  'his/her eye',  'his/her eyes',  'their eyes'.

Verbs
Finite verbs obligatorily inflect for number of the subject, person of the subject, direct object and indirect object and tense/mood. For subject person and number, compare ihpyopánzx 'I ran', inyopánzx 'you (sg.) ran', yopanzx 'it ran, she ran, he ran', hayopáncojc 'we ran', mayopáncojc 'you (pl.) ran', yopáncojc 'they ran'.

For object person (which is written as a separate word in the orthography although it is really just a prefix), compare  'I saw you (sg.)',  'I saw you (pl.)', and  'I saw him/her/it/them'.

For indirect object (also written as a separate word except in third person), compare    'I showed it to you (sg. or pl.)',  'I showed it to him/her/them'.

The verb "tenses" divide between medial forms and final forms, irrealis and realis: popánzx (irrealis, medial, third person) '(if) it/she/he runs', tpanzx (realis, medial, third person) '(as) it/she/he ran', yopánzx (distal realis, final, third person) 'it/she/he ran', impánzx (proximal realis, final, third person) 'it/she/he ran', spánxz aha (irrealis, final, third person) 'it/she/he will run'.

A verb may also be negative and/or passive.

A transitive verb may be detransitivized through a morphological operation, and causative verbs may be formed morphologically.

Postpositions and relational preverbs
The postpositions of Seri inflect for the person of their complement: hiti 'on me', miti 'on you', iti 'on her/him/it'. Most of the words that have been called postpositions at one time (and some of which still are, in limited situations) are actually relational preverbs; they must occur in a position immediately before the verbal complex and are commonly not adjacent to their semantic complements. Some of these have suppletive stems to indicate a plural complement; compare  'with you (sg.)' and  'with you (pl.)'.

Grammar
The Seri language is a head-final language. The verb typically occurs at the end of a clause (after the subject and direct object, in that order), and main clauses typically follow dependent clauses. The possessor precedes the possessum. The language does not have many true adjectives; adjective-like verbs follow the head noun in the same kind of construction and with the same kind of morphology as verbs in the language. The words that correspond to prepositions in languages like English are usually constrained to appear before the verb; in noun phrases they appear following their complement.

Articles
Seri has several articles, which follow the noun.

The singular indefinite article (a, an) is zo before consonants, and z before vowels (it presumably is historically related to the word for "one", which is tazo). The plural indefinite article (roughly equivalent to some) is pac.

There are several different definite articles (the), depending on the position and movement of the object:
 (sg. & pl.) are used with locations and verbal nouns.  is pronounced  after vowels and  after consonants.

Demonstratives
Four simple demonstrative pronouns occur, plus a large set of compound demonstrative adjectives and pronouns.

The compound demonstratives are formed by added a deictic element to an article. Examples include  ("that (standing far off)"),  ("that (standing closer)"),  ("this (standing)"),  ("that (sitting far off)"),  ("that (lying far off)"), etc. These compound demonstratives may be used either as adjectives (at the end of the noun phrase) or as pronouns.

Personal Pronouns
These pronouns may have singular or plural referents; the difference in number is indicated in the verb stem. The reflexive pronouns are  "myself",  "yourself",  "herself, himself, itself",  "ourselves",  "yourselves" and  "themselves".

Lexicon
The Seri language has a rich basic lexicon. The usefulness of the lexicon is multiplied many times over by the use of idiomatic expressions. For example, one of the many olfactory metaphors used by speakers is the expression  ("I am angry"), literally 'my.spirit stinks (Declarative)'. (The kinship terminology is among the most extensive and complicated that has been documented in the world.) Seri has a small number of loanwords, most ultimately from Spanish, but also from other languages such as O'odham.

Many ideas are expressed not with single words, but with fixed expressions consisting of several words. This kind of phrase formation is deeply ingrained in the lexicon; it has been used in the past to create new terms for lexical items that became taboo due to the death of a person whose nickname was based on that word.

Writing system
Seri is written in the Latin script.

 represents  before the vowels e and i, while c is used elsewhere, as in Spanish. Long vowels are indicated by doubling the vowel letter. The voiced lateral  is indicated by placing an underline under , i.e. . Stress is generally not indicated, but can be marked by placing an acute accent  over the stressed vowel. The representation of the rounded back consonants using a digraph which includes o-dieresis serves to visually unite morphemes that have allomorphs containing the full vowel o, the historical source of the rounded consonants. Example: xeecoj  ("wolf"), xeecöl  ("wolves").

The letters B, D, G, Gü, and V occur in some loanwords.

The Seri alphabet was developed in the 1950s by Edward W. and Mary B. Moser, and later revised by a committee of Seri men and women working with Stephen Marlett. In particular:
The diphthongs  were written    respectively, but are now considered to be allophones of  before rounded consonants, e.g. Tahéojc → Tahejöc.
Nasalized vowels were marked with an underline, but are now considered allophones occurring after , e.g. cuá̱am → cmaam.
Lengthening of vowels and consonants that follow a stressed syllable were written double, but are now considered allophonic, e.g. hóoppaatj → hóopatj. Long vowels and consonants in other situations are still written double.
Word boundaries sometimes changed, with clitics being often originally written solid with the adjacent words, but now written separately.

Literature
A growing body of Seri literature is being published. Some of the stories that were recorded, transcribed and published earlier  are now being re-edited and published. New material is also being prepared by several writers. Essays by three Seri writers appear in the new anthology of Native American literature published by the University of Nebraska Press. The most recent literature is appearing as apps for Android phones, often with accompanying audio.

The Constitution of Mexico has been translated in its entirety into the Seri language by the Instituto Nacional de Lenguas Indígenas.

Trivia
The Seri word for "shark", which is hacat, was chosen by ichthyologist Juan Carlos Pérez Jiménez to name a newly discovered species of smooth-hound shark in the Gulf of California (Mustelus hacat).

Notes

References

Hernández, Fortunato. (1904). Lengua seri o kunkáak. In Las razas indígenas de Sonora y la guerra del Yaqui, 237–294. Mexico City: J. de Elizalde.

 

Marlett, Stephen A. (2008b).  "Stress, Extrametricality and the Minimal Word in Seri". Linguistic Discovery 6.1.

External links
https://www.smg.surrey.ac.uk/projects/seri-verbs-multiple-complexities/
Seri page at Lengamer.org
SIL Mexico
Seri texts and recordings
Seri basic lexicon at the Global Lexicostatistical Database
Seri (Intercontinental Dictionary Series)

 
Hokan languages
Indigenous languages of Mexico
Indigenous languages of the North American Southwest
Language isolates of North America